Misomar Rodrigues de Amorim Júnior (born 3 October 1972), known as Júnior Amorim, is a Brazilian football coach and former player who played as a forward. He is the current head coach of Bragantino-PA.

Playing career
Amorim was born in Belém, Pará, and finished his formation with Vasco da Gama. After making his senior debut with Passo Fundo in 1992, he moved abroad to join R.E. Mouscron in the following year before returning to Sampaio Corrêa.

Amorim's first title came up in 1999, as he won the Campeonato Potiguar with ABC. After representing União São João, Portuguesa, Fortaleza and Sport Recife, he was the top goalscorer of the 2002 Campeonato Pernambucano with Santa Cruz, scoring 12 goals.

Amorim then left for city rivals Náutico, but returned to Sport in 2003. After playing for hometown sides Paysandu and Remo, he joined CRB in 2006. He later returned to the latter club in 2007, after a brief stint at America-RJ, and was the club's top goalscorer in the league during his two-year spell; his second year, however, ended in relegation.

In March 2009, Amorim returned to Alagoas after signing for CSA from Madureira; highlights included a goal in a 1–0 victory over Neymar's Santos which knocked the team out of the 2009 Copa do Brasil. He returned to CRB for the 2010 season, but was released in September of that year due to the club's poor financial situation.

In 2011, Amorim represented Coruripe, and played for Independente-PA the following year. In January 2014, after two years without a club, he joined Murici. He later moved to Santa Rita, and retired in the end of the year at the age of 42.

Managerial career
Amorim started his managerial career with Pinheirense in 2016, winning the second division of the Campeonato Paraense. On 5 December of the following year, he was named manager of his former club Independente for the ensuing campaign.

On 6 July 2018, Amorim took over Tuna Luso. In the following February, he was in charge of São Francisco-PA before being appointed João Brigatti's assistant at another of his former clubs, Sampaio Corrêa, in June.

On 20 February 2020, after Brigatti's departure to Ponte Preta, Amorim was appointed manager of Sampaio in an interim manner. He was definitely appointed manager on 3 March, after one match in charge, but was dismissed seven days later after another match.

Honours

Player
Sampaio Corrêa
Copa Norte: 1998
Campeonato Maranhense: 1998

Ceará
Campeonato Cearense: 1999

Fortaleza
Campeonato Cearense: 2001

Sport Recife
Campeonato Pernambucano: 2003

Remo
Campeonato Paraense: 2004

Individual
Campeonato Pernambucano top goalscorer: 2002 (12 goals)
Campeonato Alagoano top goalscorer: 2008 (14 goals)

Manager
Pinheirense
Campeonato Paraense Segunda Divisão: 2016

References

External links

1972 births
Living people
Sportspeople from Belém
Brazilian footballers
Association football forwards
Esporte Clube Passo Fundo players
Sampaio Corrêa Futebol Clube players
Ceará Sporting Club players
ABC Futebol Clube players
União São João Esporte Clube players
Associação Portuguesa de Desportos players
Fortaleza Esporte Clube players
Sport Club do Recife players
Clube Náutico Capibaribe players
Santa Cruz Futebol Clube players
Paysandu Sport Club players
Clube do Remo players
Clube de Regatas Brasil players
America Football Club (RJ) players
Madureira Esporte Clube players
Centro Sportivo Alagoano players
Associação Atlética Coruripe players
Murici Futebol Clube players
Associação Atlética Santa Rita players
Brazilian football managers
Tuna Luso Brasileira managers
Sampaio Corrêa Futebol Clube managers
Moto Club de São Luís managers